Wayne Ferreira and Yevgeny Kafelnikov were the defending champions but lost in the first round to Mark Knowles and Daniel Nestor.

Knowles and Nestor won in the final 6–4, 6–4 against Roger Federer and Max Mirnyi.

Seeds

Draw

Final

Top half

Bottom half

External links
 2002 Pacific Life Open Men's Doubles Draw

2002 Pacific Life Open
Doubles